Julián Cardona Tabares (born 19 January 1997) is a Colombian road racing cyclist, who currently rides for Colombian amateur team Gesprom Colombia.

Major results

2015
 Pan American Junior Road Championships
1st  Time trial
3rd  Road race
 1st  Time trial, National Junior Road Championships
2017
 1st  Time trial, National Under-23 Road Championships
 5th Time trial, Pan American Under-23 Road Championships
2018
 5th Time trial, National Road Championships

References

External links

1997 births
Living people
Colombian male cyclists
Sportspeople from Antioquia Department
21st-century Colombian people